Richard  "Rik" Waller (born 1981) is an English pop singer. After appearing as a contestant on the TV series Pop Idol, he had two UK top 40 hits with cover versions of "I Will Always Love You" and "(Something Inside) So Strong".

Early life
Waller was born in Gillingham, Kent in 1981.

Career

Pop Idol
Waller was to be a finalist in the first series of the British ITV television series Pop Idol having initially made it into the last ten of the show, but then pulled out due to severe laryngitis, and his place was taken by Darius Danesh.

EMI
Following the show, Waller signed a recording contract with EMI in a deal worth approximately £400,000. His first single was a cover version of Dolly Parton's song "I Will Always Love You" which made No. 6 on the UK Singles Chart. He followed this up with another top 40 hit, recorded originally by Labi Siffre, "(Something Inside) So Strong". Both of these songs appear on Waller's album From Now....

Red Admiral Records
When he was dropped by EMI, Waller formed his own band to take his music out on the road. He then signed an album deal with Red Admiral Records. Two months into Waller's Beyond Reality Tour 2004, three concerts were cancelled due to poor ticket sales. Among them was a show at the Princess Theatre in Torquay, Devon, for which only two tickets were sold.

His second album Innocence was released in September 2005. The band was subsequently renamed 'Rik Waller's Mighty Soul Band', and then renamed again to 'Rik Waller's Unfinished Business'.

TV appearances
Waller has appeared as himself on several TV shows. In 2002, he appeared on Celebrity Fit Club, but he was kicked off the show when he was caught binge eating.

On 28 February 2007, Waller appeared on Never Mind the Buzzcocks in the Identity Parade Round and briefly replaced captain Phill Jupitus when it became clear who was the real Rik Waller. He has not appeared on TV since.

Personal life
He was educated at The Howard School, Rainham, Kent. Waller's singing career ended in 2007 after he had lost his singing voice due to problems with severe laryngitis.

In 2013, Waller revealed in an interview with the Daily Mail that due to being jobless and penniless, he was receiving unemployment benefits. In 2014, he was working as an exam invigilator in Sittingbourne, Kent. Waller also said that, alongside his father, he once ran a mobile karaoke and disco business.

Discography

Albums
From Now... (July 2002)
Innocence (July 2005)

Singles
"I Will Always Love You" (March 2002) – UK No. 6
"(Something Inside) So Strong" (June 2002) – UK No. 25

Filmography

References

External links
Red Admiral Records

English male singers
People from Gillingham, Kent
Pop Idol contestants
1981 births
Living people
People educated at The Howard School
Musicians from Kent
EMI Records artists
21st-century English singers
21st-century British male singers